The Republic of Korea Navy was established on November 11, 1945, as the Marine Defense Group (later became the Korean Coast Guard) after Korea was liberated from the Empire of Japan on August 15, 1945. The Korean Coast Guard became the Republic of Korea Navy after the South Korean government was established on August 15, 1948.

Since its inception and until the 1990s, the Republic of Korea Navy had acquired about 150 former United States Navy ships. As South Korea's economy grew, the ROK Navy was able to build larger and better equipped fleets with local shipbuilders.

The ROK Navy employs the U.S. Navy-style letter based hull classification symbols to designate the types of its ships and hull numbers to uniquely identify its vessels (e.g. DDH 975). The names are that of the historical figures, Navy heroes, provinces, cities, counties, peaks, lakes, islands, and birds. The Chief of Naval Operations selects the names of ships.

The ship prefix for all the commissioned ROK Navy ship is ROKS (Republic of Korea Ship) when the names of ships are written in English.

Ships acquired through indigenous warship building

Submarines
Dolgorae (SSM) means the dolphin in Korean.

Frigates
Frigates (FF) were named after provinces and large cities that names previous ROK Navy destroyers had.

Corvettes
Corvettes (PCC) were named after cities.

Patrol craft
Patrol craft were named for birds.

Baekgu class
Baekgu means the seagull in Korean. Geomdoksuri means the golden eagle in Korean.

Chamsuri class
Gireogi means the goose in Korean. Chamsuri means the sea eagle in Korean.

Jebi class and Doksuri 11 class 
Jebi (PK) means the swallow in Korean. Doksuri (FB) means the vulture in Korean.

Amphibious warfare ships
Solgae (LSF) means the black kite in Korean.

Auxiliary ships
Dadohae (ASL) means an archipelago in Korean.

Sincheonji (AGS) means a new world in Korean.

Mulgae (LCU) means the fur seal in Korean.

Ships acquired after the Korean War
After the Korean War, most of the ships acquired under the terms of the Security Assistance Program based on the "Agreement between the Government of the Republic of Korea and the Government of the United States of America concerning the Loan of American Vessels".

A total of 109 ships acquired: 3 DD, 9 DD (FRAM), 3 DE, 6 APD, 3 PCE/MSF, 4 PCEC, 4 PCE, 1 PCE (AGP), 3 PC, 1 PB (PT), 9 PB, 9 FB, 4 SB, 9 LST, 1 LSMR, 12 LSM, 3 MSC(O), 8 MSC, 2 ATS, 2 ARS, 2 ATA, 1 ARL, 2 AOG, 1 AO, 1 YO, 4 AKL, 1 LCU, 1 MSB

Destroyers
Destroyers (DD, DE, APD) were named after provinces and large cities, with the exceptions of Chungmu (named after Admiral Yi Sunshin), Asan (Admiral Yi's hometown), and Ungpo (named for Admiral Yi's Battle of Ungpo).

Patrol vessels
PCEs were named for places related with Admiral Yi Sunshin's battles, with the exception of Geojin (named for Battle of Geojin in 1960).

PCs were named for mountains.

Olppaemi (PB) means the owl. Doksuri (FB) means the vulture in Korean. Boramae (SB) means the falcon in Korean.

Amphibious warfare ships
LSTs were named for mountains and mountain peaks.

LSMR was named for a town by the sea. LSMs were named for islands.

Mine warfare ships
Minesweepers (MSC) were named for towns.

Auxiliary ships
ATSs and ARSs were named for cities with an industrial complex. ATAs were named for mountains near Seoul. ARL was named for a town.

AOGs and AOs were named for lakes, with the exception of Baegyeon.

AKLs were named for port towns and later for bays (Cheonsu, Gwangyang, Yeongil).

Mulgae (LCU) means the fur seal in Korean.

Ships acquired before and during the Korean War
The Republic of Korea Navy was established as the Marine Defense Group on November 11, 1945. In June 1946, the Marine Defense Group became the Korean Coast Guard, and officially recognized by the United States Army Military Government in Korea. The Korean Coast Guard acquired 36 patrol craft (mainly ex-IJN and USN minecraft) through the Military Government. In October 1949, the ROK Navy purchased a 600-ton submarine chaser, the former USS PC-823, which was renamed as ROKS Baekdusan (PC 701) and became "the first significant warship of the newly independent nation". The Navy purchased three additional PC-461-class submarine chasers before the Korean War, which began on 25 June 1950 when North Korea invaded South Korea.

A total of 76 ships acquired: 5 PF, 6 PC, 4 PCS, 4 PT, 2 GB, 2 PG, 5 LST, 4 LSSL, 6 LCI, 18 YMS, 11 JMS, 5 AKL, 2 AO, 1 YO, 1 LT

Frigates
Frigates (PF) were named for rivers.

Patrol vessels
PCs were named for mountains. PCSs were named for planets. PTs were named for birds.

Chungmugong class (PG) was named after Admiral Yi Sunshin.

Amphibious warfare ships
LSTs were named for mountains, with the exception of Andong. LSSLs were named for bays. LCIs were named for cities.

Mine warfare ships
Minesweepers (YMS) were named for cities, counties and towns and mountains. Minelayers (JMS) were named for cities, counties, mountains, rivers, and a planet.

Auxiliary ships
AKLs were named for port towns. AOs were named for lakes. YO was named for a waterfall.

ATA was named for a mountain near Seoul.

See also
 List of active Republic of Korea Navy ships

Notes
1. Hull number: The ROK Navy does not use the number '4' when assigning hull numbers to their ships since ROKS Jirisan (PC 704; formerly USS PC-810), during the Korean War, struck a mine and sank in December 1951, resulting in death of all sailors aboard. Currently only the hull numbers of the mine layers and submarine tender end with number '0'. The hull numbers of the submarines start with the number '0'.
2. Romanization of Ship names: Romanization is according to Revised Romanization of Korean (adopted in 2000), with exceptions of personal names. Names of ships commissioned before 2000 might have been romanized according to McCune–Reischauer. Examples of changes (M-R → RR): Chinhae → Jinhae; Kangnung → Gangneung; Kimpo → Gimpo; Kyongju → Gyeongju; Pusan → Busan; Taegu → Daegu.
3. Delivery date: The date when the ROK Navy acquires a ship.

a: Hull number changed on 1978-06-01

References

External links

Republic of Korea Navy official website (Korean) (English)
 Naval Vessels Registry - Custodian Assignments: KOREA
 NavSource Naval History
 South Korea navy ships GlobalSecurity.org
 World Navies Today: South Korea Haze Gray & Underway: World Navies Today

South Korean military-related lists
 
Korea, South